Jim Broadbent is an English actor who has had multiple appearances in both television and film. For his film career, Broadbent won both an Academy Award and a Golden Globe Award (both for Iris (2001)) and a BAFTA for Moulin Rouge! For his television career Broadbent has won both a Golden Globe and a BAFTA TV Award (both for Longford (2006)) and an Emmy for The Street.

Broadbent's roles are varied from his roles as Malcom "Santa" Claus in Arthur Christmas and Horace Slughorn in Harry Potter and the Half Blood Prince and Harry Potter and the Deathly Hallows – Part 2 to his roles as King William IV in The Young Victoria and Col. Alfred Wintle in The Last Englishman.

Broadbent's acting career spans forty seven years with his debut being in 1971's The Go-Between as a spectator at a cricket match.

Film

Television

Theatre

References

Male actor filmographies
British filmographies